The 2016–17 season will be Olimpia Milano's 85th in existence and the club's 84th consecutive season in the top flight of Italian basketball and the 10th consecutive season in the top flight of European basketball. Milan is involved in four competitions.

Players

Roster

Depth chart

Players in

|}

Total spending:  €0

Players out

|}

Total income:  €0

Total expenditure: €0

Club

Technical staff

Kit

Supplier: Armani
Main sponsor: Emporio Armani

Back sponsor: EA Eyewear
Short sponsor: Aon

Pre-season and friendlies

Competitions

Overall

Overview

Italian Supercup

LBA

League table

Results by round

Matches

Results overview

EuroLeague

League table

Results by round

Matches

Results overview

Italian Cup

References

External links
  
 Forum Olimpia Milano
 EA7 Emporio Armani Milano at legabasket.it 
 EA7 Emporio Armani Milan at EuroLeague.net

Olimpia Milano seasons
Season
2016–17 EuroLeague by club
2016–17 in Italian basketball